The 16th Annual Honda Civic Tour was a concert tour headlined by American rock band OneRepublic. Sponsored by Honda and produced by Marketing Factory, the tour also featured Fitz and the Tantrums and James Arthur. The tour began on July 7, 2017 in Kansas City and concluded on September 27, 2017 in Shanghai.

Background
The band announced that they would headline the 16th Annual Honda Civic Tour. In an Instagram video, frontman Ryan Tedder stated:
"Our best memories come from summer tours in the U.S. and the Honda Civic tour has been the benchmark of summer tours. It's going to be a set list that we've never attempted before, it's going to be production we've never attempted before... and it's going to be the most interactive tour we've ever done before."

Set list
This set list is representative of the show on July 7, 2017, in Kansas City. It is not representative of all concerts for the duration of the tour.

"Stop and Stare"
"Secrets"
"Kids"
"Good Life"
"Wherever I Go"
"Better"
"Feel Again"
"Halo" / "Happier"
"Come Home"
"I Lived"
"Let's Hurt Tonight"
"All the Right Moves"
"No Vacancy"
"Apologize"
"Rich Love"
"If I Lose Myself"
Encore
"Counting Stars"
"Rumour Has It" 
"Love Runs Out"

Tour dates

Notes

References

OneRepublic
OneRepublic concert tours
2017 concert tours
Concert tours of North America
Concert tours of the United States
Concert tours of Canada
Concert tours of Asia
Concert tours of Singapore
Concert tours of Taiwan
Concert tours of Hong Kong
Concert tours of Thailand
Concert tours of Japan
Concert tours of China